is a professional Japanese Nippon Professional Baseball player. He is currently with the Chiba Lotte Marines.

External links

Living people
1983 births
Baseball people from Saitama (city)
Honolulu Sharks players
Japanese expatriate baseball players in the United States
Nippon Professional Baseball pitchers
Chiba Lotte Marines players